Armido Rizzetto (23 March 1893 – 5 June 1956) was an Italian cyclist. He competed in the men's sprint at the 1920 Summer Olympics. He was also a two-time amateur national champion.

References

External links
 

1893 births
1956 deaths
Italian male cyclists
Olympic cyclists of Italy
Cyclists at the 1920 Summer Olympics
Cyclists from the Province of Padua